The Amateur Athletic Association of Cyprus (Greek: Κυπριακή Ομοσπονδία Αθλητισμού Στίβου ΚΟΕΑΣ) is the governing body for the sport of athletics in Cyprus. 

KOEAS separated from Hellenic Amateur Athletic Association (SEGAS) in 1983. Until then, the athletics club were affiliated to SEGAS.

Affiliations 
World Athletics
European Athletic Association (EAA)
Cyprus Olympic Committee

National records 
KOEAS maintains the Cypriot records in athletics.

External links 
Official webpage 

Cyprus
Athletics
National governing bodies for athletics